

YouYi Games

2011 Stanković Continental Champions' Cup

Final

London International Basketball Invitational (2012 Olympic Games test event)

Friendlies

2011 FIBA Oceania Championship 

Australia men's national basketball team games
2011–12 in Australian basketball